Locomotives Recreation Club were an Australian rules football club which competed in the Queensland Football League from 1905 to 1909. They wore blue and black club colours.

Locomotives won back-to-back premierships in 1907 and 1908 but after failing to win a game in 1909 were forced to leave the league.

Honours

Premierships (2)
 1907
 1908

External links
Fullpointsfooty

Locomotives
Australian rules football clubs established in 1905
1905 establishments in Australia
1909 disestablishments in Australia
Australian rules football clubs disestablished in 1909